Black Field is a Greek film, directed by Vardis Marinakis. The film released in 2009 and it stars Sofia Georgovassili and Christos Passalis. It won one award in Hellenic Film Academy Awards in category Best Cinematography. The film also won accolades in Mumbai International Film Festival and Seville European Film Festival. The film is shot in the places of Epirus and Thessaly.

Plot
In 1654 in Greece under Ottoman rule, a solitary janissary collapses from his wounds outside an isolated Orthodox monastery for women. The nuns take him in and one with medical skills, Areti, tends him with the help of another, the young and shy Anthi. Both are fascinated by the presence of a man and, as he recovers, Areti starts an affair with him while Anthi has conflicting emotions. Learning that he is a deserter with a price on his head, the nuns realise that they dare not hide him and inform the authorities. As a contingent of soldiers arrives to collect him, Anthi escapes with him and the two go on the run. In the woods, a dark secret comes out. Anthi is in fact a boy, who was hidden in the monastery to avoid the devsirme, the kidnapping of Orthodox children by the Ottomans as recruits for the army. Initially disgusted, the soldier slowly builds up a comradeship with the gauche lad but one day they are recaptured. Anthi is taken back to the monastery, where Areti is pregnant and hangs herself in despair. Anthi runs away and rejoins the janissary, who has killed his captors. The two go off into the woods again.

Cast
Christos Passalis
Sofia Georgovassili
Despina Bebedelli 	
Maria Panouria
Despina Kourti
Evangelia Andreadaki

Awards

References

External links

2009 films
Greek drama films
Films about deserters
Films set in the 1650s
Films set in the Ottoman Empire
Greek LGBT-related films
2009 LGBT-related films
LGBT-related drama films